Sanjay Agarwal is an Indian businessperson, Chartered Accountant and founder of AU Small Finance Bank, where he is currently serving as the Managing Director & CEO. He was named Ernst & Young Entrepreneur of the Year Award 2018 in financial services.

Education 
He has a bachelor's degree in commerce from the Government College, Ajmer. He is a chartered accountant from the Institute of Chartered Accountants of India.

Career 
After clearing CA in 1995, Sanjay started his own venture in Jaipur. Realizing the lack of institutions to cater to the financial needs of people in rural and semi-urban Rajasthan, he decided to start a financing firm, the erstwhile Au Financiers in 1996.

He started the business with the help of a few High Net worth Individuals (HNIs) in Jaipur. For over 2 decades, Au Financiers provided funding for income generating assets and partnered with customers.

In 2015, the Reserve Bank of India commenced the Small Finance Bank (SFB) category in India to encourage financial inclusion. Of the 72 companies that applied for the SFB license, 10 received licenses. AU Bank was the only non-banking finance company to receive this license.

Agarwal was first appointed as managing director of Au Financiers on 14 February 2008. As the company transformed into a Small Finance Bank on 19 April 2017, he became the Managing Director & CEO of AU Small Finance Bank.

In 2017, the IPO of the AU Bank was oversubscribed by more than 53 times.

Awards and recognition 
 He received the Ernst & Young Entrepreneur of the Year Award 2018. The award was presented by Chief Minister of Maharashtra, Devendra Fadnavis in February 2019.
 Agarwal was honored with the Business Leader of the Year Award, 2016 under financial category by Institute of Chartered Accountants of India. The award was given by K. Pandiarajan, the Minister for School Education, Youth Affairs and Sports of Tamil Nadu.

See also 

 AU Small Finance Bank
 List of Indian entrepreneurs
 List of people from Rajasthan

References

External links 
 Sanjay Agarwal Profile
 Sanjay Agarwal's Interview at DNA India

Living people
Businesspeople from Rajasthan
Indian microfinance people
Indian bankers
Year of birth missing (living people)